Code page 1008 (CCSIDs 1008 and 5104), also known as ISO 8-bit Arabic, is used by IBM in its AIX operating system.

Codepage layout

References

1008